Maloma is a town in southeastern Eswatini. It is located about 15 kilometres south-west of Sithobela.

Maloma is the site of Eswatini's only commercially productive mine, an anthracite coal mine that began operations in 1993.

References

Populated places in Eswatini